The 1996–97 Scottish Cup was the 112th staging of Scotland's most prestigious football knockout competition. The Cup was won by Kilmarnock who defeated Falkirk in the final.

First round

Replays

Second round

Replays

Third round

Replays

Fourth round

Replays

Quarter-finals

Semi-finals

Replays

Final

References

Scottish Cup seasons
Scottish Cup, 1996-97
Scot